The original Nicene Creed was first adopted at the First Council of Nicaea in 325. In 381, it was amended at the First Council of Constantinople. The amended form is also referred to as the Nicene Creed, or the Niceno-Constantinopolitan Creed for disambiguation.

The Nicene Creed is the defining statement of belief of Nicene or mainstream Christianity and in those Christian denominations that adhere to it. The Nicene Creed is part of the profession of faith required of those undertaking important functions within the Orthodox and Catholic Churches.

Nicene Christianity regards Jesus as divine and "begotten of the Father". Various non-Nicene doctrines, beliefs, and creeds have been formed since the fourth century, all of which are considered heresies by adherents of Nicene Christianity.

In Western Christianity, the Nicene Creed is in use alongside the less widespread Apostles' Creed. In musical settings, particularly when sung in Latin, this creed is usually referred to by its first word, . On Sundays and solemnities, one of these two creeds is recited in the Roman Rite Mass after the homily. In the Byzantine Rite, the Nicene Creed is sung or recited at the Divine Liturgy, immediately preceding the Anaphora (eucharistic prayer), and is also recited daily at compline.

History 

The purpose of a creed is to provide a doctrinal statement of correct belief among Christians. The creeds of Christianity have been drawn up at times of conflict about doctrine: acceptance or rejection of a creed served to distinguish believers and heretics. The Greek word passed through Latin  into English "symbol", which only later took on the meaning of an outward sign of something.)

The Nicene Creed was adopted to resolve the Arian controversy, whose leader, Arius, a clergyman of Alexandria, "objected to Alexander's (the bishop of the time) apparent carelessness in blurring the distinction of nature between the Father and the Son by his emphasis on eternal generation". Emperor Constantine called the Council at Nicaea to resolve the dispute in the church which resulted from the widespread adoption of Arius' teachings, which threatened to destabilize the entire empire. Following the formulation of the Nicene Creed, Arius' teachings were henceforth marked as heresy.

The Nicene Creed of 325 explicitly affirms the Father as the "one God" and as the "Almighty," and Jesus Christ as "the Son of God", as "begotten of[...] the essence of the Father," and therefore as "consubstantial with the Father," meaning, "of the same substance" as the Father; "very God of very God." The Creed of 325 does mention the Holy Spirit but not as "God" or as "consubstantial with the Father." The 381 revision of the creed at Constantinople (i.e., the Niceno-Constantinopolitan Creed), which is often simply referred to as the "Nicene Creed," speaks of the Holy Spirit as worshipped and glorified with the Father and the Son.

The Athanasian Creed, formulated about a century later, which was not the product of any known church council and not used in Eastern Christianity, describes in much greater detail the relationship between Father, Son, and Holy Spirit. The earlier Apostles' Creed, apparently formulated before the Arian controversy arose in the fourth century, does not describe the Son or the Holy Spirit as "God" or as "consubstantial with the Father."

St. Thomas Aquinas stated that the phrase for us men, and for our salvation was to refute the error of Origen, "who alleged that by the power of Christ's Passion even the devils were to be set free." He also stated that the phrases stating Jesus was made incarnate by the Holy Spirit was to refute the Manicheans "so that we may believe that He assumed true flesh and not a phantastic body," and He came down from Heaven was to refute the error of Photius, "who asserted that Christ was no more than a man." Furthermore, the phrase and He was made man was to "exclude the error of Nestorius, according to whose contention the Son of God ... would be said to dwell in man [rather] than to be man."

Original Nicene Creed of 325 
The original Nicene Creed was first adopted at the First Council of Nicaea, which opened on 19 June 325. The text ends with anathemas against Arian propositions, preceded by the words: "We believe in the Holy Spirit" which terminates the statements of belief.

F. J. A. Hort and Adolf von Harnack argued that the Nicene Creed was the local creed of Caesarea (an important center of Early Christianity) recited in the council by Eusebius of Caesarea. Their case relied largely on a very specific interpretation of Eusebius' own account of the council's proceedings. More recent scholarship has not been convinced by their arguments. The large number of secondary divergences from the text of the creed quoted by Eusebius make it unlikely that it was used as a starting point by those who drafted the conciliar creed. Their initial text was probably a local creed from a Syro-Palestinian source into which they inserted phrases to define the Nicene theology. The Eusebian Creed may thus have been either a second or one of many nominations for the Nicene Creed.

The 1911 Catholic Encyclopedia says that, soon after the Council of Nicaea, the church composed new formulae of faith, most of them variations of the Nicene Symbol, to meet new phases of Arianism, of which there were at least four before the Council of Sardica (341), at which a new form was presented and inserted in its acts, although the council did not accept it.

Niceno-Constantinopolitan Creed 
What is known as the "Niceno-Constantinopolitan Creed" or the "Nicene-Constantinopolitan Creed", received this name because it was adopted at the Second Ecumenical Council held in Constantinople in 381 as a modification of the original Nicene Creed of 325. In that light, it also came to be very commonly known simply as the "Nicene Creed". It is the only authoritative ecumenical statement of the Christian faith accepted by the Catholic Church (with the addition of the Filioque), the Eastern Orthodox Church, Oriental Orthodoxy, the Church of the East, much of Protestantism including the Anglican communion. (The Apostles' and Athanasian creeds are not as widely accepted.)

It differs in a number of respects, both by addition and omission, from the creed adopted at the First Council of Nicaea. The most notable difference is the additional section:

Since the end of the 19th century, scholars have questioned the traditional explanation of the origin of this creed, which has been passed down in the name of the council, whose official acts have been lost over time. A local council of Constantinople in 382 and the Third Ecumenical Council (Council of Ephesus of 431) made no mention of it, with the latter affirming the 325 creed of Nicaea as a valid statement of the faith and using it to denounce Nestorianism. Though some scholarship claims that hints of the later creed's existence are discernible in some writings, no extant document gives its text or makes explicit mention of it earlier than the Fourth Ecumenical Council at Chalcedon in 451. Many of the bishops of the 451 council themselves had never heard of it and initially greeted it skeptically, but it was then produced from the episcopal archives of Constantinople, and the council accepted it "not as supplying any omission but as an authentic interpretation of the faith of Nicaea". In spite of the questions raised, it is considered most likely that this creed was in fact introduced at the 381 Second Ecumenical Council.

On the basis of evidence both internal and external to the text, it has been argued that this creed originated not as an editing of the original Creed proposed at Nicaea in 325, but as an independent creed (probably an older baptismal creed) modified to make it more like the Nicene Creed. Some scholars have argued that the creed may have been presented at Chalcedon as "a precedent for drawing up new creeds and definitions to supplement the Creed of Nicaea, as a way of getting round the ban on new creeds in Canon 7 of Ephesus". It is generally agreed that the Niceno-Constantinopolitan Creed is not simply an expansion of the Creed of Nicaea, and was probably based on another traditional creed independent of the one from Nicaea.

The Third Ecumenical Council (Ephesus) reaffirmed the original 325 version of the Nicene Creed and declared that "it is unlawful for any man to bring forward, or to write, or to compose a different faith as a rival to that established by the holy Fathers assembled with the Holy Ghost in Nicaea" (i.e., the 325 creed). The word  is more accurately translated as used by the council to mean "different", "contradictory", rather than "another". This statement has been interpreted as a prohibition against changing this creed or composing others, but not all accept this interpretation. This question is connected with the controversy whether a creed proclaimed by an ecumenical council is definitive in excluding not only excisions from its text but also additions to it.

In one respect, the Eastern Orthodox Church's received text of the Niceno-Constantinopolitan Creed differs from the earliest text, which is included in the acts of the Council of Chalcedon of 451: The Eastern Orthodox Church uses the singular forms of verbs such as "I believe", in place of the plural form ("we believe") used by the council. Byzantine Rite Eastern Catholic Churches use exactly the same form of the creed, since the Catholic Church teaches that it is wrong to add "and the Son" to the Greek verb "", though correct to add it to the Latin , which does not have precisely the same meaning. The form generally used in Western churches does add "and the Son" and also the phrase "God from God", which is found in the original 325 Creed.

Comparison between creed of 325 and creed of 381 
The following table, which indicates by square brackets the portions of the 325 text that were omitted or moved in 381, and uses  to indicate what phrases, absent in the 325 text, were added in 381, juxtaposes the earlier (AD 325) and later (AD 381) forms of this creed in the English translation given in Philip Schaff's compilation The Creeds of Christendom (1877).

Filioque controversy 

In the late 6th century, some Latin-speaking churches added the word  ("and the Son") to the description of the procession of the Holy Spirit, in what many Eastern Orthodox Christians have at a later stage argued is a violation of Canon VII of the Third Ecumenical Council, since the words were not included in the text by either the Council of Nicaea or that of Constantinople. This was incorporated into the liturgical practice of Rome in 1014.  eventually became one of the main causes for the East-West Schism in 1054, and the failures of the repeated union attempts.

In this sense,  is similar in meaning to the Greek term , used by the Fathers from Alexandria (especially Cyril of Alexandria) as well as others.

Views on the importance of this creed 
The view that the Nicene Creed can serve as a touchstone of true Christian faith is reflected in the name "symbol of faith", which was given to it in Greek and Latin, when in those languages the word "symbol" meant a "token for identification (by comparison with a counterpart)".

The Roman Missal now refers to it jointly with the Apostles' Creed as "the Symbol or Profession of Faith or Creed", describing the second as "the baptismal Symbol of the Roman Church, known as the Apostles' Creed".

Some evangelical and other Christians consider the Nicene Creed helpful and to a certain extent authoritative, but not infallibly so in view of their belief that only Scripture is truly authoritative. Non-Trinitarian groups, such as the Church of the New Jerusalem, The Church of Jesus Christ of Latter-day Saints and the Jehovah's Witnesses, explicitly reject some of the statements in the Nicene Creed.

Ancient liturgical versions 
There are several designations for the two forms of the Nicene Creed, some with overlapping meanings:
 Niceno-Constantinopolitan Creed can stand for the revised version of Constantinople (381) or the later Latin version or various other versions.
 Icon/Symbol of the Faith is the usual designation for the revised version of Constantinople 381 in the Orthodox churches, where this is the only creed used in the liturgy.
 Profession of Faith of the 318 Fathers refers specifically to the version of Nicaea 325 (traditionally, 318 bishops took part at the First Council of Nicaea).
 Profession of Faith of the 150 Fathers refers specifically to the version of Constantinople 381 (traditionally, 150 bishops took part at the First Council of Constantinople).

This section is not meant to collect the texts of all liturgical versions of the Nicene Creed, and provides only three, the Greek, the Latin, and the Armenian, of special interest. Others are mentioned separately, but without the texts. All ancient liturgical versions, even the Greek, differ at least to some small extent from the text adopted by the First Councils of Nicaea and Constantinople. The Creed was originally written in Greek, owing among other things to the location of the two councils.

Although the councils' texts have  (" believe[...] confess[...] await"), the creed that the Churches of Byzantine tradition use in their liturgy has  (" believe[...] confess[...] await"), accentuating the personal nature of recitation of the creed. The Armenian text has many more additions, and is included as showing how that ancient church has chosen to recite the creed with these numerous elaborations of its contents.

An English translation of the Armenian text is added; English translations of the Greek and Latin liturgical texts are given at English versions of the Nicene Creed in current use.

Greek liturgical text

Latin liturgical version 

On the latter see The Filioque Controversy above.

, which in classical Latin is used with the accusative case of the thing held to be true (and with the dative of the person to whom credence is given), is here used three times with the preposition "in", a literal translation of the Greek , and once in the classical preposition-less construction.

Armenian liturgical text

English translation of the Armenian version

Other ancient liturgical versions 
The version in the Church Slavonic language, used by several Eastern Orthodox churches is practically identical with the Greek liturgical version.

This version is used also by some Byzantine Rite Eastern Catholic Churches. Although the Union of Brest excluded addition of the Filioque, this was sometimes added by Ruthenian Catholics, whose older liturgical books also show the phrase in brackets, and by Ukrainian Catholics. Writing in 1971, the Ruthenian Scholar Fr. Casimir Kucharek noted, "In Eastern Catholic Churches, the  may be omitted except when scandal would ensue. Most of the Eastern Catholic Rites use it." However, in the decades that followed 1971 it has come to be used more rarely.

The versions used by Oriental Orthodoxy and the Church of the East may differ from the Greek liturgical version in having "We believe", as in the original text, instead of "I believe".

English translations 

The version found in the 1662 Book of Common Prayer is still commonly used by some English speakers, but more modern translations are now more common. The International Consultation on English Texts published an English translation of the Nicene Creed, first in 1970 and then in successive revisions in 1971 and 1975. These texts were adopted by several churches. 

The Roman Catholic Church in the United States adopted the 1971 version in 1973. The Catholic Church in other English-speaking countries adopted the 1975 version in 1975. They continued to use them until 2011, when it replaced them with the version in the Roman Missal third edition. The 1975 version was included in the 1979 Episcopal Church (United States) Book of Common Prayer, but with one variation: in the line "For us men and for our salvation", it omitted the word "men".

See also 

 Homoousion
 First seven ecumenical councils
 Mainline Protestant

Notes

References

Bibliography 
 
 A. E. Burn, The Council of Nicaea (1925)
 G. Forell, Understanding the Nicene Creed (1965)

Further reading 
 Extensive discussion of the texts of the First Council of Nicea
 Philip Schaff, Creeds of Christendom Volume I: Nicene Creed
 
 "The Nicene Creed", run time 42 minutes, BBC In Our Time audio history series, moderator and historians, Episode 12-27-2007

External links 
 
 
 
 Athanasius, De Decretis or Defence of the Nicene Definition 
 
 
 

 
4th-century Christian texts
Book of Concord
Ecumenical creeds
Trinitarianism
Christian terminology
Filioque
4th century in the Byzantine Empire
Entering heaven alive
Pontius Pilate
325
Nicaea
Nature of Jesus Christ